Pujal de Cabó is a hamlet located in the municipality of Cabó, in Province of Lleida province, Catalonia, Spain. As of 2020, it has a population of 16.

Geography 
Pujal de Cabó is located 117km northeast of Lleida.

References

Populated places in the Province of Lleida